Boring is an unincorporated community in Baltimore County, Maryland, United States, located at the intersection of Old Hanover and Pleasant Grove Roads, approximately five miles (8 km) north of Reisterstown. A stop on the Western Maryland Railroad, it consists of about 40 houses, the Boring Methodist Church, Boring Volunteer Fire Company (organized in 1907,) and the Boring Post Office (ZIP Code: 21020).

Boring is known for its unusual name,  which was not chosen for the pace of life, but for postmaster David Boring. The town was originally named Fairview, but the railroad asked the community to change its name, due to more than one Fairview on the rail line. It is unknown when this happened, but thought to be in the late 19th century.

The steps in front of the old country store, where the community's post office is now located, have become a popular stop for visitors, who pose there for photographs by a sign bearing the community's name. Its post office, with the community's distinctive name, opened on August 9, 1880.

Boring Gas Engine Show and Flea Market
Aside from its name, Boring is well known for its annual Boring Gas Engine Show and Flea Market, held in June by the Boring Volunteer Fire Department. Old tractors, gas engines and steam engines, which served Maryland's farming communities in the early 20th century, are exhibited during the show. Antique tractor pulls and modern garden tractor pulls, with classes ranging from 2,500 to 10,000 pounds (1134 to 4536 kg) are also featured in the show. The fire department exhibits two antique vehicles of its own at the show: a 1909 horse-drawn wagon and a 1936 Dodge Boyer engine.

In popular culture 
On the television series Homicide: Life on the Street, Detective Beau Felton tells Detective Kay Howard that his wife, Beth, is from Boring, MD, in the season 1 episode "And the Rockets' Dead Glare."

References

External links
 Boring Volunteer Fire Company

Unincorporated communities in Baltimore County, Maryland
Unincorporated communities in Maryland